Deh-e Yaqub (also Romanized as Deh-e Ya‘qūb and Deh Ya‘qūb; also known as Ya’ghoob, Ya’qob, and Ya‘qūbābād) is a village in Jorjafak Rural District, in the Central District of Zarand County, Kerman Province, Iran. At the 2006 census, its population was 17, in 8 families.

References 

Populated places in Zarand County